Oumar Barro (born 3 June 1974) is a Burkinabé former professional footballer. A midfielder, Barro gained 29 caps for the Burkina Faso national team, and had a three-year stint with Brøndby IF of the Danish Superliga between 1999 and 2002.

Football career

Club career
After having played in his home country Burkina Faso for Étoile Filante Ouagadougou and shortly in South Africa for Mamelodi Sundowns, Barro signed a four-year contract with Danish Superliga club Brøndby on 7 September 1999. He had a slow start to his career in Europe, mainly a reserve behind Peter Graulund and Ruben Bagger. In his first start for the club on 2 October 2000, he scored a hat-trick against Haderslev FK. The three goals proved to be his only for the club from Vestegnen, as he terminated his contract by mutual consent on 11 September 2002. He ended his career in his native Burkina Faso with Rail Club Kadiogo.

International career
Barro represented the Burkinabé national team at the 1998 African Nations Cup tournament, which finished fourth after losing to Congo DR on penalties in the bronze final. He was later part of the 2000 and 2002 African Nations Cup teams, which finished bottom of their respective groups in the first round of competition, thus failing to secure qualification for the quarter-finals. He played 29 matches for national team and scored 5 goals.

References

External links
 
  Brøndby IF profile

1974 births
Living people
Burkinabé footballers
Burkinabé expatriate footballers
Burkina Faso international footballers
1998 African Cup of Nations players
2000 African Cup of Nations players
Étoile Filante de Ouagadougou players
Rail Club du Kadiogo players
2002 African Cup of Nations players
Brøndby IF players
Expatriate men's footballers in Denmark
Association football midfielders
Mamelodi Sundowns F.C. players
Burkinabé expatriate sportspeople in Denmark
Burkinabé expatriate sportspeople in South Africa
Expatriate soccer players in South Africa
Danish Superliga players
21st-century Burkinabé people